Museums in American Samoa include:

 Jean P Haydon Museum
 National Marine Sanctuary of American Samoa

American Samoa
American Samoa
Museums